The first elections to High Peak Borough Council in Derbyshire, England were held in 1973. The Borough Council was formed by absorbing the municipal boroughs of Buxton and Glossop, the urban districts of New Mills and Whaley Bridge, and the rural districts of Chapel-en-le-Frith and Tintwistle.

As it was a new borough, all of the council was up for election. No party got an overall majority of councillors, meaning that the council became no overall control.

After the election, the composition of the council was:
Conservative 23
Labour 11
Liberal 2
Independent 10

Election result

Ward results

References

1973
High Peak
1970s in Derbyshire